Diamena is a genus of plants in the  Agavoideae. It contains only one known species, Diamena stenantha, endemic to the La Libertad region of Peru.

References

Agavoideae
Endemic flora of Peru
Monotypic Asparagales genera